Lê Hoàng Thiên (born 25 December 1990) is a Vietnamese footballer who plays as an attacking midfielder for V.League 1 club Bình Định.

Personal life
Hoàng Thiên was born in Phú Thiện. On 27 May 2014 he was married to Dương Thị Ngọc Nguyệt, a nurse at the local hospital. Hoàng Thiên is known for being a devout Christian who attends church weekly and was humorously known as "Người con của Chúa" (Son of God) by his team mates. He has a tattoo of a Christian cross on his left arm and a bible verse on his right.

Club career
Despite spending his whole career at that point with his home town club Hoàng Anh Gia Lai, after the end of the 2015 season Hoàng Thiên signed a two-year contract with SHB Đà Nẵng. Hoàng Thiên explained that although Hoàng Anh Gia Lai could pay him a higher salary he felt that Da Nang was the right city to raise a family and be comfortable. After failing to break into the Da Nang squad for much of the 2017 season Hoàng Thiên moved to Sài Gòn F.C. in early May of that year.

References 

1990 births
Living people
Vietnamese footballers
Association football midfielders
V.League 1 players
SHB Da Nang FC players
Hoang Anh Gia Lai FC players
People from Gia Lai Province
Vietnamese Christians
Vietnam international footballers